St. Joseph's College of Engineering and Technology, Palai (also referred to as SJCET Palai) is an Indian private college managed by the Syro-Malabar Catholic Diocese of Pala, located in Pala, Kerala, India. It is an AICTE approved college offering professional degree programs in engineering and management courses.  SJCET Palai is a constituent college of Mahatma Gandhi University, Kottayam and A P J Abdul Kalam Technological University. Four of its engineering undergraduate degree programs- Electronics and Instrumentation Engineering, Computer Science and Engineering, Electronics and Communications Engineering and Mechanical Engineering- were accredited by the National Board of Accreditation, in the year 2012 for period of 3 years. NBA has re-accredited two undergraduate degree programs Electronics and Communications Engineering and Mechanical Engineering in the year 2019 and is valid up-to 30-06-2022.  This college is an ISO 9001:2008 certified institution which regularly conducts internal and external audits.

History
St. Joseph's College of Engineering and Technology was established in 2002 by the Diocesan Technical Education Trust of the Catholic Diocese of Palai.  It was conferred with the status of minority community institution by the Government of India in the year 2008.

Courses offered

Undergraduate programmes

 B.Tech. in Electronics and Instrumentation Engineering
 B.Tech. in Civil Engineering
 B.Tech. in Computer Science and Engineering
 B.Tech. in Electrical and Electronics Engineering
 B.Tech. in Electronics and Communications Engineering *
 B.Tech. in Mechanical Engineering *

* The programs has been granted accreditation by NBA for a period of 3 years in the year 2019 and is valid up-to 2022.

Post graduate courses 
 M.Tech. in Advanced Manufacturing & Production Management
 M.Tech. in VLSI & Embedded Systems
 M.Tech. in Computer Science and Engineering
 M.Tech. in Advanced Communication & Information Systems
 M.Tech. in Power Electronics
 M.Tech. in Structural Engineering & Construction Management
 Master of Business Administration
 Master of Computer Applications

The four courses with which the college began in 2002- Applied Electronics and Instrumentation, Electronics and Communications, Computer Science and Engineering and Mechanical Engineering- are accredited by the National Board of Accreditation in the year 2012.

International Conference SINGULARIS 

The international Conference on Global Colloquium in Recent Advancement and Effectual Researches in Engineering Science and Technology (RAEREST) focus on providing an international opportunity for sharing the ideas, knowledge and information of eminent and experienced professionals from industries, research organizations, faculty, research scholars and students from academic institutions among experts and researchers working in their area of interest.

Reviewed and accepted papers will be published as one dedicated issue in Elsevier's Procedia Technology Journal and made available in open-access on Elsevier's Science Direct, which is used by millions of researchers and professionals on a monthly basis guaranteeing maximum visibility of the research paper.

The theme of the conference is Human Empowerment through Technology. The program of the conference constitutes plenary lectures, keynote lectures and invited talks from eminent scientists/technologists/ industry professionals working in the area of Mechanical, Civil, Computer Science, Electrical engineering, Electronics Engineering, Applied Electronics Engineering and related applications

Research and development activities 
 SJCET has received a financial grant of Rs 2.80 Lakh from NMICET MHRD Govt. of India to setup HD Audio Video streaming Conference through R  &  D centre of CSE Department. Mr. Deepu Job is the faculty in charge of the R & D centre.
 CSE department has initiated a  portable NAS storage solution for moving 10TB of data from IIT Madras to SJCET Campus.
 Low cost Incubator: A low cost incubator is developed and is under test as per requirement of a local resident under the guidance of Mr. Mohit John and supervision of Mr. Jomy Joseph of Applied Electronics  &  Instrumentation Department
 Bus Scheduling System:  Inspired from district collectors SMART Kottayam initiative, a smart bus schedule system is developed in-house and installed in KSRTC bus terminals of Palai & Erattupetta under the guidance of Mr.Mohit John and supervision of M/s.  Jomy Joseph,  Sreekumar K.T & Justin Tom of Applied Electronics  &  Instrumentation Department. The smart bus schedule system is also installed at Thiruvalla bus terminal.

SJCET Journal of Engineering and Management 

SJCET Journal of Engineering and Management is a technical national journal published half yearly by St. Joseph's College of Engineering and Technology, Pala.

Cynosure 2015 

Cynosure is the quadrennial technical exposition organized by St. Joseph's College of Engineering and Technology, Pala, in its endeavor for social outreach to the local and mofussil residents. The programmes and themes of Cynosure are focused on youth empowerment and inculcation of scientific temper among them. Cynosure 2015 was held during the three days from 17 to 19 September 2015.

Infrastructure and facilities
SJCET is a residential campus having residential facilities for both students and faculty. Facilities include canteen, cafeteria, book store, gymnasium, bank (South Indian Bank) and medical care centre.

Library & Information Division

Library members can access materials (such as Books, Journals, Magazines, Digital material etc.) available in the library collection. The Library reading space can accommodate nearly 200 members. The SJCET Library is fully computerized with smart ID cards and bar-code technologies. All the Library functions such as Acquisition, Circulation, Cataloguing and Serial control have been automated using integrated software.

Computer Centre
The computers provided in the college are connected by high speed LAN. A modern well - furnished Computer Centre with necessary accessories are available for students. An Internet Lab and two other computer labs are also available in the college.

SJCET Computer Center administers and manages the Campus and Residential Computer Network of the college. A fiber optic backbone which runs to a length of 10 km. provides high speed network connectivity to the Campus. Ten virtual network segments comprising nearly 750 systems are connected through fiber optic cables and high speed HP manageable switches to the Cyberoam firewall to form the network environment.

The SJCET Computer Center offers computing facility to the SJCET community. The computing resources include Servers and Workstations. A campus network with fiber optic backbone and a 200Mbit/s Leased line Internet connection and 10Mbit/s from NMECT which offer access to Internet for the students and staff round the clock, for their educational and research needs. In addition to that we have standby connection of speed 20Mbit/s.

Auditorium

An auditorium cum multipurpose building with a seating capacity of more than a thousand people was inaugurated in February 2006. The two-storied building, with balcony seating facility can accommodate 1260 people and is the longest college auditorium in Kerala.  Apart from hosting all college functions it is used for conducting yoga and meditation sessions, cultural festivals, placement tests, college exams, etc.

Gymnasium
Gymnasium facilities are available for students in the campus. For making use of this facility, students have to join the gymnasium club. Gymnasium facilities are available for ladies students and staffs at St.Mary's Hostels also.

Student hostels
The students are provided accommodation within the campus itself. The hostels in the campus are:
 St. Thomas' Hostel (for men)
 St. Alphonsa Hostel (for men)
 St. Augustine's Hostel (for women)
 St. Mary's Hostel (for women)
 Lioba Hostel (for women)

Besides these a few hostels are situated outside the campus for student accommodation.

Faculty houses
A faculty house is available in the campus for male faculty members. A separate wing in the Ladies Hostel is available for lady faculty members.

College canteen

Main Campus canteen
Main Campus canteen situated at the main entrance of the college.

Madonna Cafeteria
Madonna Cafeteria situated in front main central Campus Library.

Central canteen
In addition to the main canteen, a new central canteen has been constructed at the newly constructed DB4.

Student societies

Spandanam

Spandanam is a charity organization in SJCET that works with the aim to improve the community we live in. The organization regularly conducts visits to old-age homes, jails, orphanages and community health centers. Spandanam co-ordinates many charity related activities within SJCET, the uniform collection drive being the most notable of them all, this encourages the students to donate their old uniforms to those less fortunate.

IEEE student branch

The Institute of Electrical and Electronics Engineers (IEEE) is a global organisation to support the creation, development, sharing and application of knowledge about technology and science for the benefit of students. The IEEE student Branch of SJCET was inaugurated on 2 March 2005 by Mr. S Gopakumar, Head Computer Session VSSC & IEEE students activity Chair Kerala Section. He delivered an awareness session on IEEE and its activities. We are proud to have Mr. C Brajesh, Project manager NEST as the branch mentor. He is acting as a mediator between the college and industries. The total strength of IEEE student branch was 32 students with Mr. Binu P John as the Branch Counselor. The branch has conducted many activities like personality development Invited talks national level technical Symposium and as well as a Project Exhibition. The student branch secured the award for the largest student branch in Kerala Section for the year 2011 under the leadership of branch counselor Mr.G Sabarinath. The present branch counselor is Mr.Anoop B.N of the Electronics and Communications Department.

 In connection with IEEE Day celebrations on 6 October, an SB level Quiz contest was conducted. The Quiz was held exclusively for the IEEE Members of the college. Hridhya Bibi of S4 EEE, Libin Tomy of S4 ME were the toppers and they qualified for the finals held at GEC Trichur.
 The IEEE P.E.S. Kerala Chapter organized a  State Level Quiz Competition for the first year engineering college thstudents of the state. The final was held at SJCET on 9  October 2015. As a  part of the World IEEE day and Tenth anniversary Celebration of the IEEE student's branch of SJCET,  IEEE SB of SJCET organized its annual mega event Tesseract 2.0 on 10 October 2015.
 The event consisted of various workshops including Catia v5,  Raspberry Pi,  and Wordpress and technical talks. All classes were handled by experts and professionals. Students from various colleges participated in the events.

IEEE SB of SJCET conducted a project exhibition competition as the part of Cynosure 2k15. Innovative ideas and projects with working models were displayed at the event. Some of the prize winning projects were: Efficient All-Terrain Vehicle (ATV), Smartphone controlled Car, EWaste Bin, Mobile application for Civil Engineers and students etc. In the junior section, the prize winning projects were: Regenerative braking system and Robotic arm. IEEE stall had various exhibits like 3D Printer, Home Automation System, Virtual Reality Headsets, Google Cardboard, Object detection robots etc.

CSI student chapter

A CSI chapter is functioning in the college as a professional society for computer science students exclusively.

ISTE student chapter

Since the formation of the ISTE student chapter in July 2003, the chapter has been organizing many activities under the ISTE banner for the benefit of the members. The ISTE students' chapter of SJCET, Palai was inaugurated by Dr. D. Balakrishnan (chairman, ISTE Kerala section) in 2004.

Transportation

The college has 24 buses, one van and one car for the use of students and staff.

Buses ply from the college through Bharananganam, Erattupetta, Poonjar, Edamattom, Paika, Pinnakanad, Thidanad, Poovathode, Pala, Ettumanoor, Kuraavilangad, Kuruppanthara, Kaduthuruthy, Muttuchira, Ramapuram, Koothattukulam, Thodupuzha, Pravithanam

Student achievements 
 Mr. Nithin Babu of third year Mechanical Engineering handled a session on Entrepreneurship development for the Boot Camp at SJCET.
 Mr. Nithin Babu of third year Mechanical Engineering participated in YES I CAN meet organised by Government of Kerala for promoting entrepreneurship on 12 September 2015.
  Second year Mechanical Engineering students took part in IEEE camp held at Vimal Jyothi College of Engineering, Kannur and College of Engineering, Trivandrum.
  Nine Second year Mechanical Engineering students registered a company titled Infusory Designs in Startup Village. M/s. Akash Joseph and Thomson Tom were the student volunteers for Teenovators 2k15 organised by Manipal University in October, 2015.
 Projects of M/s. Jebin Joseph and Thomson Tom, Mechanical Engineering students were selected for the final round of the innovative project contest SMART organised by the District Administration.
  M/s. Thomson Tom and Akash Joseph, Second year Mechanical Engineering students were the finalists of BPlan Competition held at NIT, Calicut from 27 to 29 November 2015. Mr. Thomson Tom was qualified into the finals of paper presentation contest and Circuit Maze.
 Mr. Thomson Tom of Second year Mechanical Engineering attended a conference on Free and Open Source Software by ICFOSS and Kerala Start-Up Mission at Mascot Hotel, Trivandrum from 20 to 21 December 2015.
 A Technical Presentation on Recent development in the field of Computer Science and Engineering was conducted by students Mr. Sharan Sabi, Mr. Jerin Sebastian, Mr. Jeril Jacob Babu, Mr. Geo Baby and Mr.  Martin K. Vargese for S7 & S8 students in association with CSEA on 21 September 2015. It was coordinated by Mr. Jacob P. Cherian.
 One-week hands on workshop on Android Application Development was organised by members of Startup Boot camp of SJCET from 6 to 12 September 2015.
 Ms. Sethu Sathyan of S8 CSE secured student scholarship at Grace Hopper Celebration of women in computing in 2015.
 Five final year CSE students, Jeevan George Antony, Dona Maria Royce, Sethu Sathyan, Jackson M. Joseph and Jimmy Jose of S8 CSE secured the Best Startup idea presentation Award for NASSCOM startup 20-20 jointly organized by Kerala Start Up Mission and NASSCOM in August, 2015.
 Akshay Rejikumar, Mohammed Shaloof N. and Akshay Sivaprasad of EEE department secured second prize in the Soccer Colosseum at Mar Athanasios College, Ramapuram in 2015.
 Sharon Sam Kodunthara of EEE department secured first place in Magnetorace in the National Level Technical Fest at Saintgits College of Engineering, Pathamuttom in 2015.
 Justin Joseph of EEE department secured third place in Men's Kumite in the 9 Shihan Bonnie Robert's Memorial National Karate Championship held at Pala in 2015.
 ENCON Green Club members presented a Seminar on Energy Conservation at the ENCON GREEN Club Engineer's Forum, YMCA Building, Moonnani on 4 October 2015. ENCON Green Club Student Secretary M/s. Pranav Prasannan and Athul V. of EEE department presented the measures to be taken for Environment protection, Energy Conservation and Energy Efficiency.
 M/s.Kevin James, Arnold Antony, Jerin James, Linu M., Siddarth and Abhishek Sebastian secured Second prize for Acoustic Band Competition at Nakshatra 2016 held at Saintgits College of Engineering, Pathamuttom.

Sports 
Yoga and mediation

Yoga and mediation training program was conducted for the first year students. A total of 90 hours training is being conducted for nine batches where each batch has obtained at least 10 hours of training during this period. This has in turn resulted in improving mental as well as physical health of the students.

PACE annual inter-college meet 
College conducts inter-college meet for various sports games annually, which has got wide participation reaching of count 15 from various colleges all over the Kerala state. The meet consists of total five events including volleyball football, cricket, basketball, and shuttle tournament.

References

External links

Private engineering colleges in Kerala
Catholic universities and colleges in India
Colleges affiliated to Mahatma Gandhi University, Kerala
Universities and colleges in Kottayam district
Educational institutions established in 2002
2002 establishments in Kerala
Education in Pala, Kerala